Solute carrier family 13 member 2 is a protein that is encoded in humans by the SLC13A2 gene.

References

Further reading

Solute carrier family